During eight episodes, one in 2013, one in 2014, one in 2018, three in 2020, and two in 2022, Google suffered from severe outages that disrupted a variety of their services. The first was a five-minute outage of every Google service in August 2013. The second was a 25-minute outage of Gmail, Google+, Google Calendar, and Google Docs in January 2014. The third was a YouTube outage in October 2018. The fourth was a Gmail/Google Drive outage in August 2020. The fifth, in November 2020, affected mainly YouTube, and the sixth, in December 2020, affected most of their services. The seventh, in August 2022, affected Google Search, Maps, Drive and YouTube. The eighth affected Google Maps and Google Street View. These outages seemed to be global.

August 2013 services outage 
On 16 August 2013, every Google service went down for five minutes. The outage caused internet traffic to drop forty percent worldwide.

January 2014 services outage 
On 24 January 2014, Gmail, Google+, Google Calendar, and Google Docs suffered a 25-minute outage. A statement by Google described the cause:At 10:55 a.m. PST this morning, an internal system that generates configurations—essentially, information that tells other systems how to behave—encountered a software bug and generated an incorrect configuration. The incorrect configuration was sent to live services over the next 15 minutes, caused users’ requests for their data to be ignored, and those services, in turn, generated errors. Users began seeing these errors on affected services at 11:02 a.m., and at that time our internal monitoring alerted Google’s Site Reliability Team. Engineers were still debugging 12 minutes later when the same system, having automatically cleared the original error, generated a new correct configuration at 11:14 a.m. and began sending it; errors subsided rapidly starting at this time. By 11:30 a.m. the correct configuration was live everywhere and almost all users’ service was restored.

October 2018 YouTube outage 
On 16 October 2018, a global outage disrupted YouTube for approximately one hour and 2 minutes, YouTube Music and YouTube TV were affected as well. When users try to open YouTube, the website only shows a blank page without videos. On the app, an error message read, “There was a problem with the network [503].”
During the outage, the hashtag #YouTubeDown was trending on Twitter, Instagram and other social media platforms. This was known by many users as "The Great Youtube Outage of 2018". YouTube acknowledged that on Twitter. After 1 hour and 2 minutes of outage, YouTube was fixed.

August 2020 services outage 
On 20 August 2020, over a period of approximately six hours, a global outage abruptly disrupted Google's suite of services, including Gmail, Google Drive, Google Docs, Google Meet and Google Voice. The outage is reported to have started around 06:30 UTC. Google acknowledged the worldwide disruption in the G Suite Status Dashboard. Users complained that they were unable to upload files to Gmail, transfer files, and upload files to Google Drive. There were also reports that some users were unable to log in to their Gmail accounts. The reason for the technical issue is not publicly known.

November 2020 YouTube/Google TV outage 
On 11 November 2020, another outage occurred on YouTube, YouTube Music, YouTube TV, Google TV and Google Play. The outage started at roughly 12:20 UTC. Users experienced problems playing videos, error messages, and errors that caused loading loops. At 04:13 UTC, YouTube gave the all-clear on its Twitter.

December 2020 services outage 
On 14 December 2020, another global outage occurred, affecting authenticated users of most Google services, including Gmail, YouTube, Google Drive, Google Docs, Google Calendar and Google Play. The problem was due to a failure in Google Accounts; services such as YouTube were still accessible with private browsing. Google Workspace Status Dashboard showed all services as operational for approximately 40 minutes before correctly reporting their status as down. The outage started at approximately 11:45 UTC, and Google services were restored around 13:00 UTC.

Google identified the issue as an accidental reduction of capacity on their central user ID management system, causing requests that required OAuth-based authentication to fail; this also included the Google Cloud Platform.

On 15 December 2020, many emails sent to Gmail servers reported a 550 error code, which incorrectly indicates that the email address does not exist.

August 2022 services outage 

On 8 August 2022, Google Search, Maps, Drive and YouTube went down, returning HTTP 500 and HTTP 502 errors. After their services went back online, Google apologised and stated that a software update issue was to blame.

October 2022 Google Maps outage 
On 16 October 2022, Google Maps and Street View went down, resulting in an inability for photos to load and an inability for Street View to function.

See also 
 Criticism of Google
 2021 Facebook outage
 Microsoft Azure Outages
 Amazon Web Services Outages
 Downtime

References 

Criticism of Google
2020 in computing
2020s internet outages
2018 in computing
2010s internet outages
2022 in computing
2013 in computing
2014 in computing